Lansdowne Studios was a music recording studio in Holland Park, London, England, which operated between 1958 and 2006.

Background
The studio was located at Lansdowne Road, Holland Park, within Lansdowne House, a Grade II listed eight-storey building which was originally constructed in 1902–04 by Scottish architect William Flockhart, for South African mining magnate Sir Edmund Davis. The building contained apartments and artists' workshops. Among the artists who had studios in the building in the early decades of the 20th century were Charles Ricketts, Charles Haslewood Shannon, Glyn Philpot, Vivian Forbes, James Pryde, and Frederick Cayley Robinson, who are commemorated on a blue plaque on the building.

Recording studio
The building underwent significant alterations. When, in 1957, record producer Denis Preston was looking for a property in which to set up a recording studio, his assistant engineer Joe Meek found the premises, which had unusually high ceilings and a basement squash court, suitable for conversion into a studio. Preston, Meek and engineer Adrian Kerridge then established the studio, and made their first recordings there in 1958. The studio was London's first independent music recording studio. In 1962, an enlarged control room overlooking the studio floor was opened. Kerridge later became the studio's owner.

It was used in its early years by many jazz and pop musicians, and became known for the clarity of its recordings. Musicians who recorded in the studio included Lonnie Donegan, Acker Bilk, The Dave Clark Five, Donovan, The Animals, Shirley Bassey, The Strawbs, Queen, Uriah Heep, Sinéad O'Connor, and Graham Parker.

Development after recording studio closure
The studios closed in 2006. The building was subsequently converted into 13 self-contained apartments, while retaining a small recording studio.

In 2006, Jeff Lovelock, a sales trader, and wife Audrey purchased 1 Lansdowne House from studio owner and engineer Adrian Kerridge. In 2012, the renovation was featured on Grand Designs (24 October 2012).

Audrey, a designer, took charge of the three-year renovation project. The three floors—first floor, ground floor and basement—included the recording studio, a smoking room and a thermal bath. Several original features dating from 1902 were restored including the fireplace mantels, hardwood floors and the 90 foot chimney flue. The main sources of natural sunlight are the original 12-foot ground floor windows and two complex panel and spike skylights.

In 2017, the Lovelocks sold the property. At the time the 5,000 square meter, four-bedroom flat featured a raised reception room, marble floors, large enclosed courtyard and a wine cellar.

References

Recording studios in London
Buildings and structures in the Royal Borough of Kensington and Chelsea